Credit Union 1 may refer to:

 Credit Union 1 (Alaska), a credit union based in Anchorage
 Credit Union 1 (Illinois), a credit union serving Illinois, Indiana and Nevada

See also
Golden 1 Credit Union